Eugene F.J. O'Doherty (1896–unknown) was an Irish footballer who played in the Football League for Blackpool and Walsall and made two FA Cup appearances for Leeds United.

References

1896 births
Irish association footballers (before 1923)
Association football forwards
English Football League players
Blackpool F.C. players
Leeds United F.C. players
Fleetwood Town F.C. players
Wigan Borough F.C. players
Ashton National F.C. players
Halifax Town A.F.C. players
Walsall F.C. players
Morecambe F.C. players
Clitheroe F.C. players
Year of death missing